Angela Dawn Chuck (born 14 February 1981) is a Jamaican former swimmer, who specialized in sprint freestyle events. She won a total of two medals, gold in the 200 m freestyle (2:07.81), and bronze in the 100 m freestyle (58.91), at the 2002 Central American and Caribbean Games in San Salvador, El Salvador. Chuck is a two-time Olympian (2000 and 2004) and a psychology graduate of Brown University in Providence, Rhode Island.

Chuck made her first Jamaican team at the 2000 Summer Olympics in Sydney, where she competed in the women's 50 m freestyle. Swimming in heat four, she picked up a second spot and forty-ninth overall by 0.60 of a second behind leader Yekaterina Tochenaya of Kazakhstan in 27.48.

At the 2004 Summer Olympics in Athens, Chuck qualified for the 100 m freestyle, by posting a FINA B-standard entry time of 57.59 from the Caribbean Championships in Kingston. She challenged seven other swimmers on the third heat, including Olympic veterans Dominique Diezi of Switzerland and Lara Heinz of Luxembourg. She edged out Iceland's Ragnheiður Ragnarsdóttir to take a seventh spot by 0.14 of a second, outside her entry time of 58.33. Chuck failed to advance into the semifinals, as she placed thirty-ninth overall in the preliminaries.

Shortly after her second Olympics, Chuck retired from swimming to work as an assistant coach for the Blue Devils at Duke University in Durham, North Carolina.

References

External links

1981 births
Living people
Jamaican female swimmers
Jamaican female freestyle swimmers
Olympic swimmers of Jamaica
Pan American Games competitors for Jamaica
Commonwealth Games competitors for Jamaica
Swimmers at the 1999 Pan American Games
Swimmers at the 2000 Summer Olympics
Swimmers at the 2002 Commonwealth Games
Swimmers at the 2004 Summer Olympics
Sportspeople from Kingston, Jamaica
Brown University alumni
Central American and Caribbean Games gold medalists for Jamaica
Central American and Caribbean Games bronze medalists for Jamaica
Competitors at the 2002 Central American and Caribbean Games
Central American and Caribbean Games medalists in swimming